George Lewis may refer to:

Entertainment and art
 George B. W. Lewis (1818–1906), circus rider and theatre manager in Australia
 George E. Lewis (born 1952), American composer and free jazz trombonist
 George J. Lewis (1903–1995), Mexican-born American actor
 George Robert Lewis (1782–1871), English painter of landscapes and portraits
 George Lewis (clarinetist) (1900–1968), New Orleans jazz clarinettist
 George Lewis, Jr. aka Twin Shadow (born 1983), Dominican-American musician and actor

Politics
 George Lowys or Lewis (fl. 1536), mayor of Winchelsea
 George Lewis (MP for Cardiff), Member of Parliament (MP) for Cardiff, 1586
 George Cornewall Lewis (1806–1863), British statesman
 George Lewis (politician) (1820–1887), American politician, mayor of Roxbury, Massachusetts

Sports
 George Lewis (athlete) (1917–2011), track and field athlete from Trinidad and Tobago
 George Lewis (footballer, born 1875) (1875–?), English footballer
 George Lewis (footballer, born 1913) (1913–1981), Watford and Southampton footballer
 George Lewis (footballer, born 2000), Rwandan-born, Norwegian footballer
 George Lewis (rugby league), rugby league footballer of the 1920s, 1930s and 1940s
 George Lewis (rugby) (born 1901), Welsh rugby union and rugby league footballer
 Duffy Lewis (George Edward Lewis, 1888–1979), Major League Baseball player

Other
 George Lewis (British Army officer) (1735–1791), British colonel
 George Lewis (Royal Marines officer) (1774–1854), in Napoleonic Wars and War of 1812
 George Lewis (coleopterist) (1839–1926), English entomologist
 George W. Lewis (1882–1948), Director of Aeronautical Research at NACA
 George Lewis (journalist) (born 1943), American television reporter
 Sir George Lewis, 1st Baronet (1833–1911), UK solicitor, baronet
 Slave George (1794–1811), murder victim, known also as George Lewis
 George Lewis (priest) (died 1730), Archdeacon of Meath
 George F. Lewis (1828–1890), American journalist and newspaper proprietor

See also 
George Henry Lewes (1817–1878), British philosopher
George Louis (disambiguation)